Shino Kunisawa (born 27 April 1991) is a Japanese professional footballer who plays as a midfielder for WE League club Nagano Parceiro.

Club career 
Kunisawa made her WE League debut on 12 September 2021.

References 

Living people
1991 births
Women's association football midfielders
WE League players
Japanese women's footballers
Association football people from Kōchi Prefecture
AC Nagano Parceiro Ladies players